Ali ibn Abi Talib, the fourth Rashidun Caliph and first Shia Imam, was assassinated on 26 January 661 by a Kharijite named Abd al-Rahman ibn 'Amr ibn Muljam al-Muradi at the Great Mosque of Kufa, located in present-day Iraq. Ali died from his wounds two days after Abd al-Rahman struck him over his head with a poison-coated sword. He was 62 or 63 years of age at the time of his death on 21 (or 19) Ramadan 40 AH, equivalent to 28 January 661 CE. 

Ali was elected as the caliph after the assassination of Uthman in 656 but faced opposition from some factions including Mu'awiya, the incumbent governor of present-day Syria. As a result, the first Muslim civil war, known as the First Fitna, followed the assassination of Uthman, continued throughout the four-year reign of Ali, and ended with the overthrow of the Rashidun Caliphate and the establishment of the Umayyad dynasty by Mu'awiya. Notably, when Ali agreed to arbitration with Mu'awiya after the Battle of Siffin in 657, a faction of his army revolted against him. These later became known as the Kharijites. They soon began to terrorize the civilian population and were crushed by Ali's forces in the Battle of Nahrawan in July 658.

Ibn Muljam met in Mecca with two other Kharijites, namely, al-Burak ibn Abd Allah and Amr ibn Bakr al-Tamimi, and concluded that Ali, Mu'awia, and his governor of Egypt, Amr ibn al-As, were to blame for the civil war. They decided to kill the three in order to resolve the "deplorable situation" of Muslims and also avenge their fallen companions at Nahrawan. With the intention of killing Ali, Ibn Muljam headed to Kufa, where he fell in love with a woman whose brother and father were also killed at Nahrawan. She agreed to marry Ibn Muljam on the condition that he would kill Ali and also assisted him in the enterprise. After stabbing Ali at the Great Mosque of Kufa, Ibn Muljam was executed as punishment by Ali's eldest son, Hasan.

Background 

The events leading to the assassination of Ali can be traced back to the death the Islamic prophet, Muhammad, after which the Muslim community disputed over his succession. The participants at Saqifa pledged their allegiance to Abu Bakr as the first caliph. Sunni Muslims believe that Muhammad did not designate a successor before his death, whereas Shia Muslims hold that he had, in fact, appointed Ali as his successor at the Event of Ghadir Khumm. Abu Bakr was succeeded by Umar, who was murdered in 644. After Umar's death, Uthman was elected as the caliph by a council. When he was assassinated in 656, Ali was elected as the caliph.

Ali's caliphate was concurrent with the first Muslim civil war, known as the First Fitna. Though Ali was elected as the fourth Rashidun Caliph after Uthman's death, he faced opposition during his rule. On the one hand, in Mecca, Aisha, Talha, and Zubayr revolted against Ali and seized control of Basra. Aisha was Muhammad's widow, while Talha and Zubayr were two of his companions. Ali marched to Basra and emerged victorious in the Battle of the Camel in 656 against an army led by Aisha, Tahla, and Zubayr. On the other hand, Mu'awiya, the incumbent Umayyad governor of Syria, declared war on Ali, accusing him of inciting Muhajirun against Uthman and demanding the surrender of his murderers. In response, Ali maintained his innocence and urged Muawiya to present his case before Ali's court. After failed negotiations, the two parties fought the Battle of Siffin in 657, which ended in a stalemate as the two sides agreed to settle the matters by arbitration.

A group, which became known as the Kharijites, separated from Ali when he agreed to settle the dispute with Mu'awiya through arbitration. They insisted that, "Judgment belongs to God alone." Soon, they violated their oath of allegiance, revolted against Ali, and openly threatened to kill any Muslim who would not join them. Ali's forces defeated them in the Battle of Nahrawan in 658. The killing of the Kharijites has been viewed as the most problematic event of his caliphate because they had been among his most vigorous allies in the war against Mu'awiya.

Ibn Muljam and two other Kharijites, namely, al-Burak ibn Abd Allah and Amr ibn Bakr al-Tamimi, both of whom likely belonged to the Kinda tribe, met in Mecca after the pilgrimage ceremony. After long discussions, they concluded that Ali, Mu'awiya, and Amr ibn al-As were to blame for the Muslim civil war, and swore to kill them and also avenge their fallen companions at Nahrawan. They set the date of assassination and each chose his victim.

Ali's prediction of his fate 
Multiple sources write that Ali knew about his fate long before the assassination either by his own premonition or through Muhammad, who had told Ali that his beard would be stained with the blood of his head. Other accounts add that, according to Muhammad, "the evilest man among the ancients was he who had killed the camel of the prophet Salih and among his contemporaries, he who would kill Ali." The night before the assassination, Ali foretold that his fate was soon to be fulfilled. As he left the house in the morning, geese followed him, cackling, and Ali remarked that they were weeping for him.

Assassination 

Ali was assassinated by Abd al-Rahman ibn 'Amr ibn Muljam al-Muradi, a Kharijite from Egypt. Ibn Muljam belonged to the Himyar tribe paternally but was counted among the Murad due to his maternal kinship. The latter was allied with the Kinda tribe. He had entered Kufa with the intention of killing Ali to avenge for the Battle of Nahrawan.

According to al-Tabari, Ibn Muljam encountered in Kufa a group from the Taym al-Ribab tribe who were mourning ten of their tribesmen killed at Nahrawan. Among them was a woman named Quttaam, who impressed Ibn Muljam. When the latter proposed to her, she reportedly agreed on the condition that her wedding gift would include the murder of Ali. She also arranged for her tribesman, Wardan, to assist Ibn Muljam in his mission. For his part, Wardan enlisted the help of Shabib ibn Bujra. The night before the assassination, the conspirators stationed themselves opposite the door from which Ali would enter the mosque.

On Friday, 19 (or 17) Ramadan, Ali arrived at the mosque to lead the morning prayer. Ibn Muljam attacked and wounded Ali on the crown of his head with a poisoned sword after Ali had recited verses from the  al-Anbiya as part of the prayer or as he was entering the mosque. Shabib's sword, however, missed Ali and he fled and was lost among the crowd. Wardan also fled to his home where he was killed by his relative, 'Abd Allah ibn Najaba ibn Ubayd, after confessing his involvement in the assassination. Ibn Muljam was caught by the Hashimite al-Mughlra ibn Nawfal ibn al-Harith.

Ali died two days later on 21 Ramadan 40 AH (28 January 661) or 19 Ramadan 40 (26 January 661) at the age of 62 or 63. He had requested that, if he did not survive, Ibn Muljam should be executed in retaliation and this was fulfilled after his death by his eldest son, Hasan.

Role of al-Ash'ath ibn Qays 

Al-Ash'ath ibn Qays was the chief of the Kinda tribe in Kufa. According to Madelung, in the final years of Ali's reign, he was lured to Mu'awiya's side by promises and offers of money, in return for sabotaging Ali's campaign against Mu'awiya. Some sources have alleged that al-Ash'ath was aware of the plot to assassinate Ali. Al-Yaqubi, for instance, writes that Ibn Muljam was hosted by al-Ash'ath for a month in preparation for the assassination of Ali. Multiple reports, such as one by Ibn Sa'd, assert that al-Ash'ath counselled Ibn Muljam on the night of the assassination and that it was al-Ash'ath's signal, "the morning has smiled," that propelled Ibn Muljam to action at the mosque. After the assassination, Hujr ibn Adi, a commander in Ali's army, accused al-Ash'ath of complicity, though there is even a report that al-Ash'ath warned Ali about Ibn Muljam. According to 2021b, these various reports range from outright accusation to suspicion of complicity and even to an act of loyalty. 

Al-Sallabi, on the other hand, believes these accusations to be baseless, stating that al-Ash'ath was a loyalist who fought against the Kharijites in the Battle of Nahrawan. He also writes that al-Sallabi was the first one to fight the Syrians in the Battle for the Siffin. Moreover, according to al-Sallabi, there are no accounts from Ali's family that would support these accusations against al-Ash'ath, nor his family discussed it with any member of al-Ash'ath's family. When al-Ashʿath sent his son to evaluate the severity of Ali's wounds, his words are said to have suggested that he knew Ali would not survive.

Burial 

Ali's body was washed by his sons, Hasan, Husayn, and Muhammad ibn al-Hanafiyyah, and one of his nephews, Abdullah ibn Ja'far. Fearing that his body might be exhumed and profaned by his enemies, Ali was then secretly buried by them and 'Ubaydullah ibn al-Abbas. His grave was identified decades later and the town of Najaf grew around it as a major site of pilgrimage for Muslims, especially the Shia. There are also claims that he was buried at the Hazrat Ali Mazar in the Afghan city of Mazar-i-Sharif. Ali's death is commemorated by Shia Muslims every year.

After 

According to Madelung, during his rule, Ali found a loyal following who regarded him as the best of Muslims after Muhammad and the only one entitled to the caliphate. Nevertheless, this following remained a minority. Instead, after the assassination of Ali, what united Kufans was their opposition to Mu'awiya. Madelung adds that, over time, the oppressive rule of the Umayyads turned the minority of Ali's admirers into the majority.

After the assassination of Ali in January 661, his eldest son, Hasan, was elected caliph in Kufa. Soon after, Mu'awiya marched on Kufa with a sizeable army, while Hasan's military response suffered defections in large numbers, in part facilitated by military commanders and tribal chiefs who had been swayed to Mu'awiya's side by promises and offers of money. After a failed attempt on his life, a wounded Hasan, who by now only ruled the area around Kufa, ceded the caliphate to Mu'awiya in 661, who founded the Umayyad Caliphate.

Mu'awiya died in 680 and was succeeded by his son, Yazid, who is often remembered as a debaucher who openly violated the Islamic norms. Hasan's brother and Muhammad's only surviving grandson, Husayn ibn Ali, refused to pledge allegiance to Yazid and left Medina after receiving invitations from the Kufans. Husayn and his family were massacred by Yazid's forces on their way to Kufa in the Battle of Karbala on 10 Muharram (10 October 680). His death is commemorated by Shia Muslims.

In the arts 

The assassination of has been the subject of paintings by Yousef Abdinejad, Farhad Sadeghi, and Masnsoureh Hossein, as well as a stage play by Bahram Beyzai.

Abdinejad's painting is described as an artwork that uses colors to show duality: Colors from the blue spectrum, proportional to the turquoise color used to paint Ali, light beams emanating from Ali, and the angles in the work are among the elements used by the painter to inspire spirituality. In contrast, Ibn Muljam, the assassin, is painted in brown, surrounded by blue, and evil creatures are seen at his feet. In the painting, flames are about to engulf Ibn Muljam, signifying the damnation of the assassin to hellfire.

See also

 Laylat al-Mabit
 Laylat al-Qadr

References

Citations

Sources

Encyclopedias 
 
 

 
 
 

661 deaths
Assassinations in the medieval Islamic world
7th-century crime
Assassination
Deaths by blade weapons
Ali
Shia Islam and politics